The following is a list of father-and-son combinations who have played in the National Basketball Association (NBA). The list includes players who played for the Basketball Association of America (BAA) before it was renamed NBA in 1949, as well as the National Basketball League (NBL), which was absorbed by the NBA in 1949, and the original American Basketball Association (ABA), which was merged with the NBA in 1976.

Father–son

Grandfather–grandson

See also
List of second-generation National Football League players
List of second-generation Major League Baseball players

References
General

 
 
 

Specific

National Basketball Association lists
Basketball
Basketball families